Ramdas Nayak was a leader of Bharatiya Janata Party from Mumbai.  He was shot dead on 25 August 1994 by Dawood's gang at the age of 52.  He contested Vidhan Sabha elections 3-4 times with BJP, and served as a member of the Maharashtra Legislative Assembly from  Kherwadi seat, near Bandra, in 1970s.  He is best remembered for his 12-year-long private legal battle over the cement scandal which forced Antulay to resign as the state's chief minister.

References

Year of birth missing
1994 deaths
Deaths by firearm in India
Assassinated Indian politicians
People murdered in Mumbai
Maharashtra MLAs 1985–1990
Politicians from Mumbai
Bharatiya Janata Party politicians from Maharashtra
1994 murders in India

3. https://www.thehindubusinessline.com/opinion/BJP-Bombay-unit-chief-shot-dead/article20851370.ece

4. https://timesofindia.indiatimes.com/city/mumbai/d-company-shooter-feroz-kokani-dead/articleshow/3395332.cms      5. https://www.indiatoday.in/magazine/special-report/story/19940915-with-one-more-gangland-style-killing-of-politician-bombay-to-resemble-dacoit-dominated-city-809657-1994-09-14

6. https://commons.wikimedia.org/wiki/File:Ramdas_Nayak_MLA_BJP.jpg

7. https://www.upi.com/Archives/1994/08/25/Indian-party-leader-shot-dead/3137777787200/

8. https://www.rediff.com/news/1998/oct/05nayak.htm

9. https://www.independent.co.uk/news/world/europe/bombay-tense-after-shooting-1378680.html

10. https://bombaywiki.with.camp/Cement_Scam